= H. Martin Wobst =

American anthropologist

H. Martin Wobst is an American anthropologist who was at University of Massachusetts and an Elected Fellow of American Association for the Advancement of Science, Royal Anthropological Institute and Society for American Anthropology.

== Biography ==
Wobst was born in 1943 in Eickelborn, Germany. He completed his PhD Dissertation in Anthropology at the University of Michigan in 1971 and immediately took up a post in the Anthropology Department at the University of Massachusetts where he remained until 2010 when he stopped teaching full-time.
